The surname Uhlig may refer to the following people:

 Alexander Uhlig (1919-2008), German soldier
 Erika Uhlig, German slalom canoeist
 Florian Uhlig (b. 1974), German pianist
 Frank Uhlig (b. 1955), German footballer
 Herbert H. Uhlig (1907-1993), American physical chemist, famous for studying corrosion
 Oskar Uhlig, German figure skater
 Petra Uhlig (born 1954), German handball player
 Theodor Uhlig (1822-1853), German musician, writer, and friend of Richard Wagner

Surnames from given names